Birger Ernst Gustafsson (1874-1969) was a sailor from Sweden, who represented his native country at the 1908 Summer Olympics in Ryde, Great Britain. Gustafsson took the 5th place in the 6-Metre.

Sources

Swedish male sailors (sport)
Sailors at the 1908 Summer Olympics – 6 Metre
Olympic sailors of Sweden
1874 births
1969 deaths
Sportspeople from Stockholm
20th-century Swedish people